The Oshtemo Town Hall is a governmental building located at 10 South Eighth Street in Oshtemo Charter Township, Michigan. It was listed on the National Register of Historic Places in 2004.

History
European settlers first came to Oshtemo Charter Township in 1830. The township itself was organized in 1839, with the first township meeting taking place in a church that year. The area was primarily agricultural, and population grew slowly. By 1870, there were about 2000 people in the township, a figure which was not substantially increased until after World War II. In 1877, the township purchased a half-acre of land near the geographic center, and constructed this town hall to house its governmental operations. The hall also served as a community gathering place, hosting local activities such as Sunday school classes, theatrical productions, and community dances. The township used the hall until 1968, when a replacement building was erected.

Description
The Oshtemo Town Hall is a rectangular wood building measuring twenty-four feet wide by forty feet deep. The building is clad with white-painted Dutch lap siding and sits on a rubble stone foundation. It has a front-gabled roof of moderately steep pitch. The front of the building holds a central door covered with a shed-roof overhang and flanked by a pair of nine over nine double-hung, wood sash windows, measuring about eight feet tall and two and one-half feet wide. Each side wall contains three identical windows spaced equally along the wall. Two additional fixed six-paned sash windows are located about four feet above the foundation on one side.

References

National Register of Historic Places in Kalamazoo County, Michigan
Victorian architecture in Michigan
Buildings and structures completed in 1877
1877 establishments in Michigan